National Highway 348BB, commonly referred to as NH 348BB, is a national highway in India. It is a secondary route of National Highway 48.  NH-348BB runs in the state of Maharashtra in India.

Route 
NH348BB connects Chirner, Koproli and Khopta Creek in the state of Maharashtra.

Junctions  
 
  Terminal near Chirner.

See also 
 List of National Highways in India
 List of National Highways in India by state

References

External links 

 NH 348BB on OpenStreetMap

National highways in India
National Highways in Maharashtra